The knockout stage of the 1997–98 UEFA Champions League began on 4 March 1998 and ended with the final at the Amsterdam Arena in Amsterdam on 20 May 1998. The eight teams from each of the six groups in the group stage competed in the knockout stage. For the quarter-finals, each group winner was randomly drawn against the runner-up from another group. The four quarter-final winners were then drawn together for the semi-finals, the winners of which contested the final.

Each quarter-final and semi-final was played over two legs, with each team playing one leg at home; the team that scored the most goals over the two legs qualified for the following round. In the event that the two teams scored the same number of goals over the two legs, the team that scored more goals away from home qualified for the next round; if both teams scored the same number of away goals, matches would go to extra time and then penalties if the teams could not be separated after extra time.

Draw dates
The draw for the quarter-finals and semi-finals was announced on 17 December 1997 and 20 March 1998. UEFA reported that the final would be played at Amsterdam Arena.

Qualified teams

Bracket

Quarter-finals

|}

First leg

Second leg

Real Madrid won 4–1 on aggregate.

Juventus won 5–2 on aggregate.

Borussia Dortmund won 1–0 on aggregate.

1–1 on aggregate. Monaco won on away goals.

Semi-finals

|}

First leg

The match kick-off was over an hour late due to Real Madrid fans in the stadium's south stand bringing down the goal structure below them while the teams were posing for their pre-match photos. In addition to the CHF1.3 million monetary fine, UEFA punished Real for the following Champions League season by forcing it to play its first home group stage match at least 300km away from their home venue.

Second leg

Juventus won 6–4 on aggregate.

Real Madrid won 2–0 on aggregate.

Final

References

External links
1997–98 UEFA Champions League season at UEFA.com

Knockout Stage
1997-98